"Pray for You" is a song recorded by American country music duo The Swon Brothers for their self-titled debut album (2014). The song was written by Jessi Alexander, Tommy Lee James, and Eric Paslay, and was produced by Mark Bright and The Swon Brothers. It was first released to digital retailers September 23, 2014 as the first promotional single off the album, and was subsequently serviced to American country radio on November 3, 2014, as the album's second official single.

Critical reception
Carrie Horton at Taste of Country praised the song for being a "solid, if not ground-breaking" follow-up to "Later On". In particular, Horton complimented the balancing of the lyrics' mature message with the more upbeat production, writing: "The drums are heavy, the guitars are swaggering and the vocal performances from Zach and Colton Swon are layered and just edgy enough to add complexity and a bit of good fun to a somewhat serious song."

Music video
The music video was directed by David Poag and premiered in February 2015.

Chart performance

Release history

References

2014 songs
2014 singles
The Swon Brothers songs
Arista Nashville singles
Songs written by Jessi Alexander
Songs written by Tommy Lee James
Songs written by Eric Paslay
Song recordings produced by Mark Bright (record producer)